Brimborium is a remix album by the industrial rock band KMFDM. It was released on 19 February 2008.

It features remixes of several tracks from 2007's Tohuvabohu, one remix from Hau Ruck, and the new track "What We Do for You", which consists of voice messages from the KMFDM Fan Phone and whose title references the band's 1993 hit, "Light".

"Brimborium" is a German word that translates to "hoo-ha", "mumbo-jumbo", or "rigmarole".

The background drop zone in the artwork by Aidan Hughes was based using an old street map on his home town of New Brighton.

Track listing

References

KMFDM albums
2008 remix albums
Metropolis Records remix albums
Industrial remix albums